The Fat Spy is a 1966 Z movie that attempts to parody teenage beach party films rather than spy films. It was filmed at Cape Coral, Florida. It is featured in the 2004 documentary The 50 Worst Movies Ever Made. Briefly released to theaters in 1966, it was rarely seen until the 1990s, when it was released to the public domain. Since then it has been widely released on DVD and VHS in various editions sold mainly at dollar stores.

The film was shot on location in Cape Coral, Florida, according to the book Images of America: Cape Coral (Arcadia Publishing, 2009) written by members of the Cape Coral Historical Society. Featured in the film is Cape Coral Gardens, a popular public rose garden during the early 1960s, which was known for a series of quaint, interconnected foot bridges. The tourist attraction no longer exists.

Plot
A mostly-deserted island, which is believed to be the home to the fountain of youth, is off the coast of Florida. The island gets some visitors in the form of a teenage boy band, The Wild Ones, and their gang of swimsuit-clad young people, including Frankie (Jordan Christopher) and Nanette (Lauree Berger) and their sidekick Dodo (Johnny Tillotson). The gang heads there in a crowded powerboat ostensibly for a scavenger hunt. However, they spend about half their screen time crooning to each other, or dancing on the beach.

The island's wealthy owner, George Wellington (Brian Donlevy), recruits his daughter, Junior (a then pregnant Jayne Mansfield), to remove the teenagers from the island. Junior is eager to see her love interest (and the island's only resident), rotund toupee-wearing botanist Irving (Jack E. Leonard). However, Irving is more interested in flowers and his bicycle than in the amorous Junior. Wellington asks Irving to spy on the teenagers, which he does by donning a sweatshirt that reads "Fink University", and "getting their trust" by joining them in dancing the Turtle. Meanwhile, Irving's twin brother Herman (also Jack E. Leonard, without a toupee), Wellington's trusted employee, plots with his love interest, the scheming Camille Salamander (Phyllis Diller), to find the fountain of youth first.

Cast
Jack E. Leonard as Irving and Herman
Brian Donlevy as George Wellington
Phyllis Diller as Camille Salamander
Jayne Mansfield as Junior Wellington
Johnny Tillotson as Dodo Bronk
Jordan Christopher as Frankie
Lauree Berger as Nanette
The Wild Ones as Themselves
 Lou Nelson as Punjab the Sikh
 Toni Lee Shelly as Naomi the Mermaid
 Penny Roman as The Secretary
 Chuck Alden as Treasure Hunter
 Eddie Wright as Treasure Hunter
 Tommy Graves as Treasure Hunter
 Tommy Trick as Treasure Hunter
Linda Harrison as Treasure Hunter

Soundtrack
 "Wild Way of Living" - Written by Chuck Alden and Jordan Christopher, performed by Jordan Christopher and The Wild Ones
 "People Sure Act Funny" - Written by Chuck Alden and Jordan Christopher, performed by Jordan Christopher and Chuck Alden
 "I'd Like To Be a Rose In Your Garden (But I'm Just a Thorn in Your Side)" - Written by Joel Hirschhorn, Al Kasha and Hank Hunter, performed by Jayne Mansfield
 "Where Is The Girl For Me" - Performed by Johnny Tillotson
 "If I See You Again - Performed by Johnny Tillotson
 "You Put Me Down The Nicest Way You Can" - Performed by Lauree Berger
 "C'mon Down" - Performed by Jordan Christopher and The Wild Ones

See also
List of American films of 1966

Notes

External links
 
 
 
 2009 Review at Film Threat

1966 films
Beach party films
1960s English-language films
Cape Coral, Florida
Troma Entertainment films
American spy comedy films
Films shot in Florida
1960s spy comedy films
1966 comedy films
1960s American films